Frédéric Tcheng is a French film director, screenwriter, and cinematographer. He is best known for his documentaries Dior and I, Halston, and Invisible Beauty.

Life and career 
Tcheng was born and raised in Lyon, France. After studying engineering in Paris, he moved to New York City where he obtained a Masters of Fine Arts from Columbia University's film school in 2007. His first foray into documentary was the 2008 documentary Valentino: The Last Emperor, which he co-produced and co-edited. In 2011, he was the writer and co-director of Diana Vreeland: The Eye Has to Travel, which premiered at the Venice International Film Festival.

Tcheng’s solo directorial debut, Dior and I, premiered at the 2014 Tribeca Film Festival. The acclaimed documentary focuses on Raf Simons’ first haute couture collection for Dior. In 2019, he directed the documentary Halston for CNN Films and Amazon. The film reframes the story of the American designer Halston as a business thriller and premiered at Sundance Film Festival. Tcheng’s latest film, Invisible Beauty, about model and activist Bethann Hardison, premiered at the 2023 Sundance Film Festival. 

Tcheng also served as an editor on the second season of the Netflix series Making a Murderer, and a cinematographer on the documentary King Georges. He served as a jury member at the Warsaw film festival and CPH:DOX and as a filmmaking mentor for Queer art, a non-profit arts organization that serves a diverse community of LGBTQ+ artists.

Filmography

Awards and nominations

References

External links 

French film directors
French screenwriters
French cinematographers
Living people
Year of birth missing (living people)
Columbia University School of the Arts alumni